Jubilee Bus Station or JBS is a bus station located in Secunderabad, Telangana, India. It is one of the two main bus stations for buses leaving Hyderabad city, the other being MGBS. It is owned by state run bus transport corporation, TSRTC. JBS is located about 2 km from Secunderabad Railway Station and 800m distance from JBS Parade Ground Station.

Services
There are about 540 bus services daily to various parts of Telangana, Andhra Pradesh, Karnataka and other neighboring states.

References

Transport in Telangana
Bus stations in Telangana
Transport in Hyderabad, India